VoicePulse is a New Jersey-based American communications company that uses its VoIP network to deliver phone service to residential and business consumers.

VoicePulse was founded in North Brunswick, New Jersey in April 2003 by Ravi Sakaria and Ketan Patel.

References

External links
 

VoIP companies of the United States
Companies based in Middlesex County, New Jersey
Companies established in 2003